Kanpur district was a district in the Indian province of Uttar Pradesh until 1977. It was then split into two districts:

 Kanpur Nagar district, the area around the city of Kanpur
 Kanpur Dehat district, the area to the west of Kanpur, administered from Mati-Akbarpur

See also
 Kanpur, a city in Uttar Pradesh